Deagon Deviation is a major road in Brisbane, Queensland, Australia. It provides part of the road connection between the Brisbane CBD and Redcliffe (via Sandgate Road). It is designated State Route 26 throughout its length.

The road is divided for all of its route, consisting of four lanes.

Route description
From its southern end the Deagon Deviation veers west and then north, skirting the western boundary of the Deagon Racecourse and approaching the Gateway Motorway. It then runs north-north-west, between the Gateway Motorway and the Deagon Wetlands, until the motorway turns west at the Bracken Ridge Road intersection. It passes under Bracken Ridge Road and gradually turns to the north-east on its way to its northern end. For much of this section it passes between residential areas and tidal wetlands.

History
Prior to the opening of the Deagon Deviation in 1979 the route from Deagon to the Houghton Highway was via a series of residential streets defined as part of State Route 27. In 1986, with the opening of the Deagon to Bruce Highway section of the then Gateway Arterial Road, a  section of the northbound carriageway was removed, with traffic diverted to the new road. In 2018 the Deagon Deviation was re-opened as a separate road to the Gateway Motorway, extended from the motorway to Braun Street.

Major intersections
The entire road is in the Brisbane local government area.

See also
 List of road routes in Queensland
 Redcliffe Peninsula road network

References 

Roads in Brisbane